Topolany is a municipality and village in Vyškov District in the South Moravian Region of the Czech Republic. It has about 400 inhabitants.

Notable people
František Vymazal (1841–1917), linguist and writer

References

Villages in Vyškov District